The Shambaa people, also called the Sambaa, Shambala, Sambala or Sambara (Wasambaa, in Swahili), are a Bantu ethnic group. Their ancestral home is on the Usambara Mountains of Lushoto District, Bumbuli District. They are native to the valleys and eastern Usambara Mountains of Korogwe District, Korogwe Urban District and western Muheza District of northern Tanga Region of Tanzania. The word Shamba means "farm", and these people live in one of the most fertile Tanzanian region. In 2001, the Shambaa population was estimated to number 664,000.

Language
The Shambaa people speak the Shambala language, also known as Kisambaa, Kishambaa, Kishambala, Sambaa, Sambala, Sambara, Schambala, Shambaa.

Kishambaa is the Sambaa word for the Shambala language, Wasambaa are the people (Msambaa for a person), and Usambaa or Usambara is used for Sambaa lands.  The Shambaa call their lands Shambalai.

They are related to the Bondei and Zigua people, and the Shambala language is mutually intelligible with Bondei and Zigua, with the three groups sharing significant overlap in territory and a long history of intermarriage. The similarity between them has prompted some to refer to themselves as "Boshazi" (the first syllable from each of the three groups).

Sambaa belongs to the North East Coastal Bantu languages. This is a group which includes Swahili; however, Swahili is not mutually intelligible with Sambaa.

History

The WaSambaa were ruled by the Kilindi dynasty from the mid-18th century to the end of the 19th century. The founder of the dynasty was Mbegha, and his son Bughe established the hilltop capital at Vuga. The kingdom reached its greatest extent under Kimweri ye Nyumbai. After he died in 1862 a civil war broke out over the succession, fueled by competition for the new wealth that the caravan trade in the Pangani valley had brought to the region.

Smallpox and slave trading contributed to the disintegration of the kingdom, and in 1898 a fire destroyed Vuga. The Germans took control. Under colonial rule the dynasty continued to have some authority, but in 1962 the Tanzanian government removed all power from the hereditary chiefdoms. Kimweri ye Nyumbai's descendant Kimweri Mputa Magogo (died 2000) was the last Lion King.

The Usambara area was the early colonial headquarters for German East Africa during the hot season.  Tanganyika, the name for the German colony, and later for the republic and eventually for the mainland portion of Tanzania is itself from Sambaa:  Tanga means farmed land, and nyika is brushy land.

References

Bibliography

 
Ethnic groups in Tanzania
Indigenous peoples of East Africa
People from Tanga Region